This is the complete list of Commonwealth Games medallists in badminton from 1966 to 2022.

1966 British Empire and Commonwealth Games

1970 British Commonwealth Games

1974 British Commonwealth Games

1978 Commonwealth Games

1982 Commonwealth Games

1986 Commonwealth Games

1990 Commonwealth Games

1994 Commonwealth Games

1998 Commonwealth Games

2002 Commonwealth Games

2006 Commonwealth Games

2010 Commonwealth Games

2014 Commonwealth Games

2018 Commonwealth Games

2022 Commonwealth Games

References

 
 

Badminton
medalists
Commonwealth Games

de:Commonwealth Games/Badminton